The 1999 San Marino Grand Prix (formally the Gran Premio Warsteiner di San Marino 1999) was a Formula One motor race held at Imola on 2 May 1999. It was the third race of the 1999 Formula One World Championship.

The 62-lap race was won by German Michael Schumacher, driving a Ferrari, after he started from third position. Finn Mika Häkkinen took pole position in his McLaren-Mercedes, but crashed out after 17 laps. Häkkinen's teammate, Briton David Coulthard, finished second, with Brazilian Rubens Barrichello third in a Stewart-Ford.

Report

Race
Mika Häkkinen took an instant lead from David Coulthard and Michael Schumacher after the start. Eddie Irvine was ahead of Rubens Barrichello, Heinz-Harald Frentzen, Ralf Schumacher, Damon Hill and Jean Alesi. Jacques Villeneuve was left stranded on the grid after a clutch problem. In an unforced error, Häkkinen crashed out at the final Traguardo chicane on lap 17, allowing David Coulthard into the lead ahead of Michael Schumacher.

This remained unchanged until both drivers made pitstops for fuel and tyres. Schumacher stopped earlier and for a shorter time than Coulthard allowing him to take over the lead from the McLaren driver. Schumacher then gradually expanded his lead to a maximum of about 23 seconds before making a second pit stop. He was able to stay in first place and thereafter comfortably retained his position to secure his first win of the season. 

Meanwhile, Schumacher's teammate Irvine had settled in third place following Häkkinen's retirement. He was forced to retire from the race himself when his Ferrari engine expired on lap 47. Frentzen span off shortly afterwards on the oil left by Irvine's Ferrari. This allowed Hill to inherit third place, but he made his final stop in a three stop strategy two laps later. Barrichello was consequently promoted to third place which he held until the end of the race ahead of Hill.

Johnny Herbert looked set to finish in fifth place until his Ford engine expired coming out of the Villeneuve chicane with three laps remaining. Alessandro Zanardi spun off shortly afterwards on the fluid spread by Herbert's stricken Stewart-Ford, allowing Giancarlo Fisichella and Alesi to complete the top six.

Classification

Qualifying

Race

Championship standings after the race

Drivers' Championship standings

Constructors' Championship standings

References

San Marino Grand Prix
San Marino Grand Prix
San Marino Grand Prix
May 1999 sports events in Europe